The Grand Hotel, now known as the Oberoi Grand, is situated in the heart of Kolkata on Chowringhee Road. It is an elegant building of British era and is a famous building in Kolkata. The hotel is owned by Oberoi chain of hotels.

History

The house was converted into a boarding house by Mrs. Annie Monk who later expanded her business to include Numbers 14, 15 and 17. 16 Chowringhee was occupied by a theatre owned and managed by Arathoon Stephen,  an Armenian from Isfahan. When, in 1911, the theatre burned down, Stephen bought out Mrs. Monk and, over time, redeveloped the site into what now makes up the modern hotel. Built in an extravagant neoclassical style, the hotel soon became a popular spot amongst the English population of Calcutta. It was known, in particular, for its annual New Year party that, along with iced champagne and expensive gifts, involved the release of twelve piglets in the ballroom. Anyone who caught a piglet, could keep it.

In the 1930s, sometime after the death of Stephen, a typhoid epidemic in Calcutta resulted in the death of six people at the hotel. The drainage system at the hotel was suspected and it was closed in 1937.

The hotel got a major lift during World War II when about 4000 soldiers were billeted there, and would party regularly. Events like the U.S. Marines' Ball at the hotel remind visitors of such times.

Features

The hotel features a large white building covering an entire block, colonnaded verandahs and balconies on the upper floors, projecting portico for the entire length of the block supported on paired columns with Ionic capitals, and stucco ornamentation in the facade.

Awards
Top Hotels in India Zagat Survey, Top International Hotels, Resorts and Spas 2005
Best Business Hotel in Asia: Nominated International Business Asia and CNBC
Best Hotel in the Five Star Deluxe Category in Eastern India Department of Tourism, Government of West Bengal

Gallery

References

External links

The Official site

Hotels in Kolkata
The Oberoi Group